Saint Veranus of Cavaillon (Vrain) (died c. 590) was a French saint, with a cultus in Italy.  He was born at Vaucluse and was bishop of Cavaillon.

Gregory of Tours writes of miracles performed by Veranus, including the expulsion of a dragon. He is also remembered as a leader in charitable works and as a patron of local monasteries, not only in France but also in Italy, particularly in the city of Albenga, where he was instrumental in the conversion of the people to Christianity.

In the early 11th century some of his relics were transferred from his place of burial to Orléans. In the 13th century most were transferred again, to Cavaillon Cathedral, which is dedicated to him, but some were sent to Albenga Cathedral in Liguria, where they are still preserved in a shrine.

Placenames

The French villages of Saint-Véran and Saint-Verain are named after him.

In Fontaine de Vaucluse there is a church called after the Saint.  It was the place of his birth and in the small church there is a tomb reputed to be that of the Saint.

Notes

External links
Musee de Conte 
Santiebeati.it: San Verano di Cavaillon 
Saint of the Day, October 19: Veranus of Cavaillon at SaintPatrickDC.org
Catholic Online: Veranus

Bishops of Cavaillon
6th-century Frankish bishops
590 deaths
6th-century Frankish saints
Year of birth unknown